Corymbia bleeseri, commonly known as the glossy-leaved bloodwood or the smooth-stemmed bloodwood, is a species of tree that is endemic to northern Australia. It has thin, rough bark on part or all of the trunk, smooth bark above, lance-shaped to curved adult leaves, flower buds in groups of seven, creamy white flowers and barrel-shaped fruit.

Description
It has thin, rough, scaly, tessellated, greyish and red bark over part or all of the trunk, smooth white to cream-coloured or pale grey bark above. Flowering occurs between March and July and the flowers are creamy white.

Taxonomy and naming
The glossy-leaved bloodwood was first formally described in 1927 by Blakely in the Journal and Proceedings of the Royal Society of New South Wales and given the name Eucalyptus bleeseri. In 1995, Ken Hill and Lawrie Johnson changed the name to Corymbia bleeseri. The specific epithet (bleeseri) honours "Mr. F. A. K. Bleeser, Assistant Postmaster, Port Darwin, who for upwards of 38 years has taken a very keen interest in the flora and fauna of the Northern Territory".

Distribution and habitat
Corymbia bleeseri grows in open forest and woodland in lateritic or sandstone soils on well-drained flats and plateaus from near Derby to Cambridge Gulf in Western Australia, in the Top End of the Northern Territory, and on nearby islands.

See also 
 List of Corymbia species

References 

bleeseri
Myrtales of Australia
Rosids of Western Australia
Flora of the Northern Territory
Plants described in 1995